Himachal Pradesh was established in 1948 as a Chief Commissioner's Province within the Union of India. The province comprised the hill districts around Shimla and southern hill areas of the former Punjab region. Himachal became a part C state on 1951 with the implementation of the Constitution of India. Himachal Pradesh became a Union Territory on 1 November 1956.  On 18 December 1970 the State of Himachal Pradesh Act was passed by Parliament and the new state came into being on 25 January 1971. Thus Himachal emerged as the eighteenth state of the Indian Union.

In earlier times, the area was variously divided among smaller kingdoms, such as those of  Chamba, Bilaspur, Bhagal and Dhami. After the Gurkha War of 1815–1816, it became part of the British India.

Pre-Independence

Prehistory

Some evidences have been found that nearly 2 million years ago man lived in the foothills of Himachal Pradesh. Bangana valley of Kangra, Sirsa valley of Nalagarh and Markanda valley of Sirmour are found to be the places where prehistoric man used to live.

Prior to the migration of the Aryan people to Ancient India, the Himalayan territories between the 'River Sutlej' and the 'River Yamuna' were under the administration of an ancient people called the Kiratas, their king being King Shambhar. Their kingdom was located on the crossroads between 'Tibet' and 'India'. The Kiratas were skilled in archery and warfare while also being great traders who exported plenty of trade items between 'Tibet' and 'India'. There are many ancient scriptures denoting the behaviour, appearance and territories of the Kiratas.
According to the 'Kirtarjuniya', Lord Shivatook the form of a Kirata hunter to disguise himself from Arjuna. It is a local legend often told by locals of some Himalayan regions such as Himachal Pradesh, Uttarakhand, Nepal, Sikkim and Darjeeling. The famous war between the Aryan King  'Divodas' and the Kirata King 'Shambhar' is mentioned in an ancient Hindu scripture, the ‘Rigveda’. King Shambhar had 99 forts in the Western Himalayan region of what is now regarded to be Himachal Pradesh. This war between the Indo-Aryans and Tibeto-Burman 'Kiratas' lasted for a total of 40 years sometime between 3,000BC to 2,500BC and led to the destruction of 99 of the aforementioned forts, King Shambhar and his ally Verchi were slain at a place known as 'Udubraj', supposedly where the war had taken place. This led to the demise of the Kiratas in the Western Himalayas and led to them fleeing eastwards to Nepal and North-East India. The Aryan people were able to successfully enter India after their victory against the Ancient Kiratas. 
Descendants of the ancient Kiratas are still found today in Modern-Day Nepal and some parts of North-East India.

The foothills of the state were inhabited by people from Indus valley civilization which flourished between the time period of 2250 and 1750 BC. Before indus valley civilization, Koli, Holi, Dooms and Chnnals used to live here.

Medieval history

In about 883 AD Shankar Verma, the ruler of Kashmir exercised his influence over Himachal Pradesh. The region also witnessed the invasion of Mahmud Ghazni in 1009 AD, who during that period he looted the wealth from the temples in the North India. In 1043 AD the Rajputs ruled over the territory. 

In 1773 AD the Rajputs under Katoch Maharaja Sansar Chand-II possessed the region, until the attack by Maharaja Ranjit Singh in 1804 which crushed the Rajput power.

The small kingdom had enjoyed a large degree of independence till the eve of the Muslim invasions in northern India. The states of the foothills were devastated by Muslim invaders a number of times. Mahmud Ghazni conquered Kangra at the beginning of the 11th century. Timur and Sikander Lodi also marched through the lower hills of the state and captured a number of forts and fought many battles.

The Gorkhas, a martial tribe came to power in Nepal in 1768. They consolidated their military power and began to expand their territory.

The Gurkhas marched in from Nepal and captured the area. Gradually the Gorkhas annexed Sirmour and Shimla. Under the leadership of Bada Kaji (equivalent to General) Amar Singh Thapa, Gorkhas laid siege to Kangra. They managed to defeat Sansar Chand, the ruler of Kangra, in 1806. However Gorkhas could not capture Kangra fort which came under Maharaja Ranjit Singh in 1809.

British period

This led to the Anglo-Gorkha war. They came into direct conflict with the British along the tarai belt after which the British expelled them from the provinces of the Satluj. Thus British gradually emerged as the paramount powers. In early 19th century the British annexed the areas of Shimla after the Gurkha War of 1815–16. Himachal became a centrally administered territory in 1948 with the integration of 31 hill provinces and received additional regions in 1966.

The revolt of 1857 or the first Indian war of independence resulted due to the building up of political, social, economic, religious and military grievances against the British government. People of the hill states were not politically alive as the people in other parts of the country. They remained more or less inactive and so did their rulers with the exception of Bushahr.

Some of them even rendered help to the British government during the revolt. Among them were the rulers of Chamba, Bilaspur, Bhagal and Dhami. The rulers of Bushars rather acted in a manner hostile to the interests of British.

The British territories in the hill came under British Crown after Queen Victoria's proclamation of 1858. The states of Chamba, Mandi and Bilaspur made good progress in many fields during the British rule. During World War I, virtually all rulers of the hill states remained loyal and contributed to the British war effort both in the form of men and materials. Amongst these were the states of Kangra, Nurpur, Chamba, Suket, Mandi and Bilaspur

Post independence
After independence the Chief Commissioner's province of H.P. came into being on 15 April 1948. Himachal became a part C state on 26 January 1950 with the implementation of the Constitution of India. Himachal Pradesh became Union Territory on 1 November 1956. On 18 December 1970 the State of Himachal Pradesh Act was passed by Parliament and the new state came into being on 25 January 1971. Thus H.P. emerged as the eighteenth state of Indian Union.

Under the name of Greater Nepal, some in Nepal have asked for the return of states previously usurped by Nepal that were annexed by the British East India Company.  However, little support for this motion exists in these regions.

References